This is a list of genera in the green algae class Trebouxiophyceae, sub-divided by order and family. Some genera have uncertain taxonomic placement and are listed as incertae sedis. Ranks without accepted subordinate taxa have been omitted. The list is based on the data available in AlgaeBase, the Integrated Taxonomic Information System (ITIS), the National Center for Biotechnology Information taxonomic database (NCBI), and other taxonomic databases.

Order Chlorellales

Family Chlorellaceae 

 Acanthosphaera
 Actinastrum
 Apatococcus
 Apodococcus
 Auxenochlorella
 Carolibrandtia
 Catena
 Chlorella
 Chloroparva
 Closteriopsis
 Compactochlorella
 Coronacoccus
 Coronastrum
 Cylindrocelis
 Dicellula
 Dictyosphaerium
 Didymogenes
 Fissuricella
 Follicularia
 Geminella
 Gloeotila
 Golenkiniopsis
 Hegewaldia
 Helicosporidium
 Heynigia
 Hindakia
 Hormospora
 Kalenjinia
 Keratococcus
 Leptochlorella
 Marasphaerium
 Marinichlorella
 Marvania
 Masaia
 Meyerella
 Micractinium
 Mucidosphaerium
 Muriella
 Nannochloris
 Nanochlorum
 Palmellochaete
 Parachlorella
 Planktochlorella
 Podohedra
 Prototheca
 Pseudochloris
 Pseudosiderocelopsis
 Pumiliosphaera
 Siderocelis
 Zoochlorella

Family Eremosphaeraceae
 Excentrosphaera
 Neglectella

Family Oocystaceae 

 Amphikrikos
 Catenocystis
 Cerasterias
 Chodatella
 Chodatellopsis
 Chondrosphaera
 Coenolamellus
 Conradia
 Crucigeniella
 Cryocystis
 Dactylococcus
 Didymocystis
 Ecballocystopsis
 Ecdysichlamys
 Echinocoleum
 Elongatocystis
 Eremosphaera
 Ettliella
 Fotterella
 Franceia
 Glochiococcus
 Gloeocystopsis
 Gloeotaenium
 Gloxidium
 Granulocystis
 Granulocystopsis
 Hemichloris
 Jaagichlorella
 Juranyiella
 Keriochlamys
 Kirchneriellosaccus
 Makinoella
 Makinoelloideae
 Micracantha
 Mycacanthococcus
 Mycotetraedron
 Nephrochlamys
 Nephrocytium
 Oocystaenium
 Oocystella
 Oocystidium
 Oocystis
 Oocystopsis
 Oonephris
 Ooplanctella
 Pachycladella
 Palmellococcus
 Pilidiocystis
 Planctonema
 Planctonemopsis
 Planktosphaerella
 Pseudobohlina
 Pseudochlorococcum
 Pseudococcomyxa
 Quadricoccus
 Rayssiella
 Reinschiella
 Rhombocystis
 Saturnella
 Schizochlamydella
 Scotiella
 Selenoderma
 Sestosoma
 Siderocystopsis
 Tetrachlorella
 Thelesphaera
 Trigonidiella
 Trochiscia

Family incertae sedis 
 Ankistrodesmopsis
 Picochlorum

Order Microthamniales 
Family Microthamniaceae
 Microthamnion

Order Phyllosiphonales 
Family Phyllosiphonaceae
 Mysteriochloris
 Phyllosiphon
 Phytophysa
 Polulichloris

Order Prasiolales

Family Koliellaceae 

 Ekerewekia
 Koliella
 Pseudochlorella
 Raphidonema
 Raphidonemopsis

Family Prasiolaceae 

 Desmococcus
 Diplosphaera
 Hormidium
 Prasiococcus
 Prasiola
 Prasiolopsis
 Prasionella
 Prasionema
 Rosenvingiella
 Rosenvingiellopsis
 Schizogonium
 Stichococcus

Family incertae sedis 
 Elliptochloris

Order Trebouxiales

Family Botryococcaceae 

 Botryococcus
 Caulodendron
 Dichotomococcus
 Elaeophyton
 Selenodictyon

Family Trebouxiaceae 

 Asterochloris
 Dictyochloropsis
 Heterochlorella
 Lobosphaera
 Myrmecia
 Parietochloris
 Symbiochloris
 Trebouxia
 Trochisciopsis
 Vulcanochloris
 Watanabea

Order incertae sedis

Family Coccomyxaceae 

 Choricystis
 Coccomyxa
 Dactylothece
 Diogenes
 Dispora
 Lusitania
 Nannokloster
 Palmogloea
 Paradoxia

Family Dictyosphaeriaceae 

 Dactylosphaerium
 Dimorphococcopsis

Family Micractiniaceae 

 Phythelios

Family incertae sedis 

 Autumnella
 Chloroidium
 Chloropyrula
 Crucigenia
 Desertella
 Edaphochlorella
 Eremochloris
 Glaphyrella
 Heveochlorella
 Kalinella
 Koliellopsis
 Lemmermannia
 Leptosira
 lunachloris
 Parachloroidium
 Pseudomarvania
 Rhopalosolen
 Viridiella
 Xerochlorella
 Xylochloris

References

External links 

 
 
  
 

 * 
Trebouxiophyceae
Trebouxiophyceae
Trebouxiophyceae